{{Infobox person
| name = Garrett Morris
| image = Garrett Morris in Los Angeles 2013 (2).jpg
| image_size = 
| caption = Morris in 2013
| birth_name = Garrett Isaac Morris
| birth_date = 
| birth_place = New Orleans, Louisiana, U.S.
| occupation = Actor, comedian, singer
| nationality =
| death_date = 
| education = Dillard UniversityJuilliard School of Music
| years_active = 1960–present
| known_for = Saturday Night LiveThe Jamie Foxx Show2 Broke Girls
| spouse = 
}}

Garrett Isaac Morris (born February 1, 1937) is an American actor, comedian and singer. He was part of the original cast of the sketch comedy program Saturday Night Live, appearing from 1975 to 1980, and played Jimmy on The Jeffersons (1983–1984). Morris also had a role as Junior "Uncle Junior" King on the sitcom The Jamie Foxx Show, which aired from 1996 to 2001. Morris had a starring role as Earl Washington on the CBS sitcom 2 Broke Girls, from 2011 to 2017. He is also known for his role in the sitcom Martin as Stan Winters, from 1992 to 1995, and the film Cooley High.  He played Slide in Car Wash (1976), and Carl in The Census Taker (1984).

Early life and career
Morris was born on February 1, 1937, in New Orleans, Louisiana, and grew up in the poverty-stricken Gert Town neighborhood in its 17th Ward.  A church-choir singer from his youth, he trained at the Juilliard School of Music and graduated from Dillard University in 1958. Early in his career, he performed with The Belafonte Folk Singers. In 1960 Garret Morris recorded South African Freedom Songs (EPC-601) with Pete Seeger and Guy Carawan for Folkways Records. He performed in a number of Broadway musicals, including Hallelujah, Baby! and Ain't Supposed to Die a Natural Death. In 1965, he worked alongside Amiri Baraka, Sun Ra, Albert Ayler and Sonia Sanchez at the Black Arts Repertory Theatre/School in Harlem; during this period, the theater was frequently raided and surveilled by the New York City Police Department and the Federal Bureau of Investigation. He had a small role as a police sergeant in The Anderson Tapes (1971) and was a cast member in the short lived CBS sitcom, Roll Out. He also appeared as a high school teacher in the 1975 film Cooley High.

Morris also lived in Fort Lauderdale, Florida.

Saturday Night Live
Morris has appeared in numerous television shows and films since the early 1970s, but is best known as one of the original cast members of NBC's Saturday Night Live. Periodically on SNL he sang classical music: once a Mozart aria "Dalla Sua Pace", Don Ottavio's aria from Don Giovanni when guest-host Walter Matthau designated him as a "musical guest...in place of the usual crap", and once a Schubert lied while the titles on the screen expressed his colleagues' purported displeasure at having to accommodate a misguided request by him. In February 1977, he sang Tchaikovsky's Nur wer die Sehnsucht kennt barefoot in colorful Caribbean dress while subtitles explained he had just returned from Jamaica where he had picked up a girl by claiming to be Harry Belafonte.

One of Morris' best known characters on SNL was the Dominican baseball player Chico Escuela. Chico spoke only limited and halting English, so the joke centered on his responding to almost any question with his catch phrase: "Baseball... been berra berra good... to me". Another recurring bit, used in the newscast segment Weekend Update, involved Morris being presented as "President of the New York School for the hard of hearing" and assisting the newscaster by shouting the main headlines, in a parody of the then-common practice of providing sign language interpretation in an inset on the screen as an aid to the deaf viewer.

According to the book Saturday Night: A Backstage History of Saturday Night Live, Morris was frequently unhappy during his tenure on SNL from 1975 to 1980, and expressed the opinion that he was usually typecast in stereotypical roles. Black performers who have followed Morris on SNL have at times been publicly concerned with experiencing the same fate Morris did. Eddie Murphy, for example, told TV Guide in the early 1980s that SNL producer Jean Doumanian "had tried to Garrett Morris me".

Recurring characters
 Chico Escuela, a Dominican baseball player for the New York Mets
 Cliff, the streetwise friend to the Festrunk Brothers (Dan Aykroyd and Steve Martin)
 Grant Robinson, Jr., one of The Nerds
 Hodo, one of Miles Cowperthwaite's cronies
 Merkon, the leader of the Coneheads
 Weekend Update's "News for the Hard of Hearing" translator, who simply repeated each line while speaking very loudly.

Later life and career
In 1976, Morris appeared in the film Car Wash, playing the role of Slide the bookmaker. In 1983 and 1984, Morris appeared in five episodes of The Jeffersons, playing a character named Jimmy. He starred in the 1984 film The Census Taker, a 1984 black comedy directed by Bruce R. Cook.

In 1985, he appeared in Larry Cohen's science fiction horror film The Stuff, playing cookie magnate "Chocolate Chip Charlie", a parody of Famous Amos. That year he also guested on Murder, She Wrote as "Lafayette Duquesne". In 1986, Morris began playing a regular occasional character, "Arnold 'Sporty' James", on the NBC cop drama Hunter, starring Fred Dryer and Stepfanie Kramer. Morris appeared in Married... with Children as Russ, one of Al's poker buddies, in "The Poker Game", in a 1987 season 1 episode and again in the season 23 episode "Requiem for a Dead Barber". Garrett Morris continually appeared as "Sporty" on Hunter through 1989. He also appeared in the 1992 horror comedy Severed Ties starring Oliver Reed.

In 1994, he was "shot by a would-be mugger", whom he "attempted to fight off", but recovered as he discussed on the January 14, 2016, episode of Marc Maron's podcast WTF. On Howard Stern's radio show on July 20, 1995, Morris said the culprit was imprisoned not for the shooting, but for parole violations for other crimes. In another radio interview, he mentioned that the robber who shot him was eventually convicted and incarcerated. In prison, inmates who happened to be fans of Morris teamed up and beat up the robber in revenge. At the time of the shooting, Morris was starring on Martin as Martin's first boss, Stan Winters. Morris' shooting rendered him temporarily unable to continue in the role; he was written out of the show by having the character become a national fugitive. The scene where he is about to undergo plastic surgery was shot on the hospital bed Morris occupied while recuperating from the 1994 assault. He made a final appearance as Stan during the show's third season, walking with a cane due to Morris' real injuries, but the reason given for Stan was that he had crashed his car during a police chase.

Morris also had regular roles on Diff'rent Strokes, The Jeffersons, Hill Street Blues, 227, and Roc. He also appeared in an episode of Who's the Boss, "Sam's Car" (1989), playing the role of Officer Audette. He was a regular cast member on The Jamie Foxx Show, playing Jamie's uncle, Junior King, for the show's entire run.

In 1998, Morris appeared as himself in the fourth episode of the fifth season of the TV series, Space Ghost Coast to Coast. In 2002, Morris made a cameo appearance on an episode of Saturday Night Live hosted by Brittany Murphy. In 2006, Morris reprised his role as "Headmaster of the New York School for the Hard of Hearing" in a cameo on the TV series Family Guy, in the episode "Barely Legal". He continued to perform regularly in films. He also operated and was the host of his own comedy club, The Downtown Comedy Club in downtown Los Angeles. On February 9, 2007, Los Angeles mayor Antonio Villaraigosa honored Garrett Morris for his work and contributions to the black community. He declared February 9, 2007, Garrett Morris Day and named The Downtown Comedy Club the official club of Los Angeles. In August 2008, Morris played the role of Reverend Pratt in the family comedy drama film, The Longshots, starring Ice Cube and Keke Palmer.

In 2009, Morris appeared in two TV commercials for the Nintendo DS—one featuring Mario Kart DS, and the other featuring Brain Age: Train Your Brain in Minutes a Day!. In 2010, Morris appeared in a television commercial for Miller Lite. The national commercial, titled "PopPop", features Morris alongside actors Stacey Dash and Jason Weaver. The commercial takes a light-hearted look at a family relationship with Morris playing the grandfather, PopPop, and Weaver as his grandson. , Morris has appeared in an ad for Orbit gum in the United States.  In 2011, Morris had a cameo role as a Catholic priest on the episode "Three Boys" on the Showtime series Shameless. He was cast as Earl in the CBS comedy 2 Broke Girls, which premiered on September 19, 2011. During the second season he faced a lawsuit from the Global Agency accusing him of not paying 10% of his income from the show as agreed. However, a rep from the show stated that he had not actually failed to do so.

In 2015, Morris appeared in a cameo in Ant-Man, referencing an old SNL sketch in which he played the first live-action incarnation of the character. On September 9, 2016, Morris and his family appeared on the ABC's game show Celebrity Family Feud, playing against Alfonso Ribeiro and Ribeiro's friends. In 2018, Morris appeared in the NBC show This Is Us. In 2019, Morris appeared in the fifth episode of A Black Lady Sketch Show'', titled "Why Are Her Pies Wet, Lord?".

Filmography

Film

Television

References

External links
 
 
 
 
 Video: 
 Garrett Morris as Chico on Weekend Update
 The Downtown Comedy Club

1937 births
Living people
African-American male actors
American male film actors
African-American male comedians
American male comedians
American male musical theatre actors
American male television actors
American male voice actors
American people of Cuban descent
American shooting survivors
Male actors from Los Angeles
Male actors from New Orleans
Dillard University alumni
20th-century American male actors
21st-century American male actors
American sketch comedians
Comedians from California
20th-century American comedians
21st-century American comedians
20th-century African-American male singers
21st-century African-American people